Bondorf is a municipality in the district of Böblingen in Baden-Württemberg in Germany. It is the southernmost municipality in the Stuttgart administrative district and the Region of Stuttgart.

References

Böblingen (district)